Shap Pat Heung West is one of the 31 constituencies in the Yuen Long District of Hong Kong.

The constituency returns one district councillor to the Yuen Long District Council, with an election every four years. Shap Pat Heung West is loosely based on western part of Shap Pat Heung with estimated population of 19,402.

Councillors represented

Election results

2010s

Notes

References

Shap Pat Heung
Constituencies of Hong Kong
Constituencies of Yuen Long District Council
2015 establishments in Hong Kong
Constituencies established in 2015